Chytonix elegans is a species of moth of the family Noctuidae found in Costa Rica.  The species was described by Schaus in 1911.

References

External links 

 

Hadeninae
Moths described in 1911